The 3rd Territorial Army was a Royal Yugoslav Army formation which commanded three infantry divisions during the German-led Axis invasion of the Kingdom of Yugoslavia in April 1941 during World War II. It was commanded by Armiski General (Lieutenant General) Jovan Naumović.

Order of battle
On 6 April 1941, the 3rd Territorial Army comprised: 
5th Infantry Division Šumadijska	
20th Infantry Division Bregalnička	(reinforced)
46th Infantry Division Moravska	
Infantry Detachment Strumiki (brigade strength)	
21st Infantry Regiment
114th Heavy Artillery Regiment (motorised)

Footnotes

References
 

Field armies of the Kingdom of Yugoslavia
Military units and formations of Yugoslavia in World War II
Military units and formations disestablished in 1941
Military units and formations established in 1941